Owen McDonnell (born 1974) is an Irish actor. He is known for his roles in the RTÉ drama Single-Handed (2007–2010), the TG4 Western An Klondike (2015–2017), and the BBC spy thriller Killing Eve (2018–2022).

Early life
McDonnell was born in Galway in Ireland. He attended the Central School of Speech and Drama in London, England, moving to the city in 1996. Before breaking into film and television, McDonnell did a lot of theatre in Ireland and the United Kingdom.

Career
McDonnell had a role in the 2003 feature film Conspiracy of Silence. It was RTÉ Television's police drama Single-Handed that was McDonnell's television career break. He starred in all four series of the programme and was nominated for an IFTA Award for the role in 2011. McDonnell was given the lead role of Garda Sergeant Jack Driscoll after receiving a call from casting director Maureen Hughes. Appearing onstage in The Lieutenant of Inishmore in Galway Town Hall at the time, McDonnell, alongside two other cast members, left for Dublin to read the script for the original Single-Handed director Colm McCarthy. He was given the lead role a day later.

McDonnell appeared in RTÉ's Wild Decembers, MI5 thriller Spooks on BBC One, crime thriller Silent Witness also on BBC One, and the first two series of sitcom Mount Pleasant on Sky1.

In 2014 McDonnell starred as Inspector Fiachra Greene in the Irish language movie An Bronntanas (The Gift), screened at the Galway Film Fleadh and later put forward as Ireland's submission for the Best Foreign Language Film category at the 87th Academy Awards (2015). The film is edited from the five-episode television series of the same name, screened on TG4 in October and November 2014.

In 2015 McDonnell starred in the hit TG4 series An Klondike, a western set in the Klondike gold rush. In 2016 he starred in Wrecking the Rising, about time travelling gobdaws who accidentally kill PH Pearse before the Easter Rising, and in the short film An Béal Bocht based on Flann O'Brien's satirical novel.

In 2018, McDonnell first appeared as Niko Polastri, husband to Sandra Oh's title character in Killing Eve. Upon meeting him at the first script read-throughs, Oh immediately felt that their on-screen relationship would be believable, and would serve as an important grounding force for her character.

Personal life
McDonnell lives in London with his British girlfriend Jill.

Filmography

References

External links

2014 interview with McDonnell about his career and upcoming roles

Living people
1974 births
20th-century Irish people
21st-century Irish people
Irish male film actors
Irish male stage actors
Male actors from Galway (city)
Male actors from London